Statistics of Úrvalsdeild in the 1963 season.

Overview 
It was contested by 6 teams, and KR won the championship. ÍA's Skúli Hákonarsson was the top scorer with 9 goals.

League standings

Results
Each team played every opponent once home and away for a total of 10 matches.

References 

Úrvalsdeild karla (football) seasons
Iceland
Iceland
Urvalsdeild